Georgio is a variant of George.

It may refer to:

Mononyms
Georgio (singer) (born 1966), full name Georgio Alentini, born George Allen. American singer, songwriter, and musician
Georgio (rapper) (born 1993), birth name Georges Édouard Nicolo, French rapper and singer of Gudeloupean origin

First name / Given name
Georgio Georgiades, from cast of TV series The Only Way Is Essex
Georgio Psychoundakis (1920–2006), Greek Resistance fighter on Crete during the Second World War)

See also
George (name)
Georgios
Giorgio (disambiguation)